David Harte may refer to:

 David Harte (Gaelic footballer)
 David Harte (field hockey)

See also
 David Hart (disambiguation)